Mount Airy is a mountain located in the Catskill Mountains of New York north of Kingston. Plattekill Mountain is located west, and Mount Marion is located south-southwest of Mount Airy.

References

Airy
Airy